Miles Anderson (born 23 October 1947) is a British stage and screen actor, born in the colony of Southern Rhodesia, who has appeared in television serials both in the United Kingdom, and North America. He appeared as Alistair the photographer in the film La La Land. In 2021 he played 'Lennox' in Joel Coen's The Tragedy of Macbeth with Denzel Washington and Frances McDormand. He is commonly remembered in the UK for his role as Lieutenant Colonel Dan Fortune in ITV television show Soldier Soldier that aired in 1991-92

Born in 1947 in Southern Rhodesia, now Zimbabwe, Anderson was educated at Prince Edward School. His father was Major-General J. Anderson, CBE, the commander of the Southern Rhodesian Army who was dismissed in 1964 because of his opposition to the colonial government's plans for denial of native African rule upon independence; and his mother, Daphne, wrote The Toerags a memoir of her difficult childhood in Rhodesia. Miles has appeared in the US television series, Criminal Minds, as well as the UK series Ultimate Force in which he played Colonel Aiden Dempsey for the entirety of its production. He had previously played Lt. Col. Dan Fortune in ITV's Soldier Soldier (series 1 and 2 only, 1991–92).

He was awarded the 1982 London Critics' Circle Drama Theatre Award for Best Supporting Actor of 1981 for his performances in The Twin Rivals and The Witch of Edmonton and an Olivier Nomination for his performance as Sigismund in Calderon's Life's A Dream at the Royal Shakespeare Company. His numerous performances for television include Fall of Eagles, Z-Cars, The Sweeney. Campion, House of Cards, Oliver's Travels, Every Woman Knows a Secret and Holby City. Anderson has also appeared in two episodes of Midsomer Murders entitled "Death In Disguise" and "Last Year's Model", and was the voice of Poseidon in the 1997 TV adaptation of The Odyssey.

Anderson was seen as Major Marchbanks in the BBC adaptation of Philip Pullman's The Ruby in the Smoke and in 2007, he appeared in the sixth series of the crime-drama Waking the Dead. In 2008, he made a brief appearance as Edward Tunstall in the BBC's EastEnders. He also narrated the Sky1 version of the New Zealand documentary The Lion Man and appeared in an episode of A Touch of Frost.

In 2010, Anderson appeared as the title character in The Madness of George III mounted by director Adrian Noble at San Diego's Old Globe Theatre. He won the San Diego's Critics' Circle award for Best Actor. In 2011, he played Prospero in The Tempest and Salieri in Amadeus, both directed by Noble. In 2013, he again won the San Diego Critic's Circle Award for his Shylock in Adrian Noble's production of Shakespeare's The Merchant of Venice.

In 2015, Anderson appeared as Renard in the BBC TV series The Musketeers (episode 2.5 "The Return"). His film credits include roles in The Thirty Nine Steps (1978), The Shillingbury Blowers (1980), Sky Bandits (1986) and Cry Freedom.

Anderson is an associate member of RADA. He is the father of actor Joe Anderson and chef Max Anderson.

Filmography

Film

Television

References

External links

1947 births
English male television actors
Living people
Alumni of Prince Edward School
Alumni of RADA
Rhodesian emigrants to the United Kingdom